The Man Called X is an espionage radio drama that aired on CBS and NBC from July 10, 1944, to May 20, 1952. The radio series was later adapted for television and was broadcast for one season, 1956–1957.

People
Herbert Marshall had the lead role of agent Ken Thurston/"Mr. X", an American intelligence agent who took on dangerous cases in a variety of exotic locations. Leon Belasco played Mr. X's comedic sidekick, Pegon Zellschmidt, who always turned up in remote parts of the world because he had a "cousin" there. Zellschmidt annoyed and helped Mr. X.

Jack Latham was an announcer for the program, and Wendell Niles was the announcer from 1947 to 1948. Orchestras led by Milton Charles, Johnny Green, Felix Mills, and Gordon Jenkins supplied the background music.

The series was created by Jay Richard Kennedy who later adapted The Man Called X to a 39-episode syndicated television series (1956–1957) starring Barry Sullivan as Thurston for Ziv Television.

Episodes

Season 1 (1956)

Season 2 (1956–1957)

References

External links

The Definitive: The Man Called X article and log
The Man Called X episodes online
The Man Called X at CVTA

American radio dramas
1940s American radio programs
1950s American radio programs
Television series by MGM Television
CBS Radio programs
NBC radio programs
1956 American television series debuts
1957 American television series endings
American spy drama television series